Kare (Kãrɛ̃, Kareng; autonym nzáà kã́rĩ́, where nzáà = "mouth") is a southern Mbum language of the Central African Republic, spoken by the Kare people in the mountains of the northeasterly Ouham-Pendé prefecture around Bocaranga. It is spoken by around 97,000 people in the country, and another few thousand speakers in Cameroon. The language's presence on the southeastern edge of the Mbum family is thought to reflect early 19th-century migrations from the Adamawa Plateau, fleeing Fulani raids.

Ethnologue 17 reports that Kare is intelligible with Mbum proper. However, languages more closely related to either are not reported to be intelligible. Ethnologue lists Tale (Tali) as a dialect, but Blench (2004) leaves it unclassified within the Mbum languages. Ethnologue also lists Kali as a synonym; Blench lists a Kali language in a different branch of the Mbum languages.

Phonology 

Kare has  the following consonantal phonemes:

It has the following vowel phonemes:

There is a phonological contrast between high and low tone (eg sá "say" vs. sà "laugh"), and a rarer phonetic mid tone whose phonological status is not established.  Only monosyllabic words may bear rising or falling tone.

Grammar 

The basic word order of Kare is subject-verb-object, eg kɛ́ hòrò húrù (3SG eat manioc) "he ate manioc".

Negation is handled with the sentence-final particle yá "not"; when negated, the locative copula yè "be (in a place)" is replaced by tí, and the equative copula ɓá "be (equivalent to)" by tí ɓá.

Verbal nouns are formed by raising the last syllable's tone and adding a suffix -Cà, where C = l or r after an oral vowel, n after a nasal vowel, and is empty after a consonant: fà "deny" > fárà "denial", sɛ̀l "untie" > sɛ́là "untying".

Pronouns

Kare has no grammatical gender.  Its personal pronouns are as follows:

To these may be added hánà "each other, other".

Noun phrases 

There is a closed class of morphologically invariant adjectives (eg fé "new", sɛ́ŋɛ́ "red"), which typically precede the noun but may also follow it to indicate a permanent quality, or may be used as nouns in their own right.  Determiners (hánà "other", kɛ́ "the", yɛ̀í "this", yɔ̀ɔ́ "that", nɛ̄ "that yonder") follow the noun, and are followed by the plural marker rì: nzù kɛ́ rí pí (person DEF PL also) "the people too". Numerals and quantifiers come at the end, following the (optional) plural marker: nzù ndíɓí "five people" (person five),  nzù rì sérè "two people" (person PL two). Direct genitives are formed by juxtaposition, eg sã̀ũ̀ lìà (root story) "the story's basis"; analytic genitives use the particle ʔà, eg vùn ʔà bá (house GEN father) "the father's house". Relative clauses are formed with a demonstrative followed (not always immediately) by the relative marker ɗá, eg nzù yɛ̀í ɗá rí mí léóɗáà (person this REL rob me yesterday) "the person who robbed me yesterday".

Prepositions 

All adpositions in Kare precede their complement.  There are four primary (pure) prepositions: kà "with (instrumental)", té "with (comitative)", ʔá "in", báŋ "like", eg kɛ́ ɡí té bá nɛ̄ (3SG come with father 3SG.POSS) "he came with his father".  Alongside these there are a number of secondary postpositions transparently derived from nouns (often body parts), eg tûl "head" > túl "on top of".

Bibliography
 François Lim, Description linguistique du Kare (phonologie-syntaxe), Université de la Sorbonne Nouvelle. Paris, 1997, 368 pp. (thèse).

References

Roger Blench, 2004. List of Adamawa languages (ms)

Languages of the Central African Republic
Languages of Cameroon
Mbum languages